Isabella of Spain may refer to:

 Isabella I of Castile (1451–1504)
 Infanta Isabella Clara Eugenia of Spain (1566–1633)
 Isabella II of Spain (1830–1904), first and so far only queen regnant of Spain

See also
 María Isabella of Spain (1789–1848)
 Isabella, Princess of Asturias (disambiguation)
 Isabella of Castile (disambiguation)